Katagiri Dam is a dam in the Nagano Prefecture, Japan, completed in 1989.

References 

Dams in Nagano Prefecture
Dams completed in 1989
1989 establishments in Japan